Christopher A. Brown (born August 3, 1964) is an American Republican Party politician who represented the 2nd Legislative District in the New Jersey Senate from January 9, 2018, to July 19, 2021, when he left office to accept a position with the New Jersey Department of Community Affairs. He previously served in the New Jersey General Assembly from January 10, 2012, to January 9, 2018. He is a veteran of the Gulf War.

Early life 
Brown was born in Atlantic City, New Jersey in 1964. He earned a B.A. degree from Rutgers University in 1987, and after graduation was commissioned as a Second Lieutenant in the United States Army. He served in the Army during the Gulf War, attached to the 82nd Airborne Division. He was awarded the Bronze Star Medal and Combat Infantryman Badge for his service in the ground offensive in Iraq. He received a J.D. degree from Widener University School of Law in 1991. In 1991–1992, Brown interned with L. Anthony Gibson, Presiding Judge of the Chancery Division of the New Jersey Superior Court for Atlantic and Cape May Counties. In 1992–1993, he clerked for Superior Court Judge Charles R. Previti. He is board certified by the New Jersey Supreme Court as a civil trial attorney and has been admitted to the bar in New Jersey and Pennsylvania. He has served as the Prosecutor of Egg Harbor Township, Solicitor for the Atlantic City Council, Solicitor for the Atlantic City Board of Education and Assistant Solicitor for Egg Harbor Township. In 2008, Brown was called up for service in the Iraq War and spent three months preparing to deploy to Iraq. However, the Army determined that it had made a mistake in activating him, and he was sent home, receiving an honorable discharge. Brown is a resident of Ventnor City, New Jersey with his wife Christine, married 1993, and their three children.

New Jersey Assembly 
In 2011, Brown ran as a Republican for the General Assembly representing the 2nd District, filling the seat of Vincent J. Polistina, who left the Assembly in an unsuccessful bid for the New Jersey Senate, running against incumbent Jim Whelan. Brown and his running mate John F. Amodeo defeated the Democratic candidates, Alisa Cooper and Damon Tyner. He was sworn in on January 10, 2012. In the Assembly he served as Assistant Republican Leader from January 12, 2016, to January 9, 2018.

Committees 
Consumer Affairs 
Tourism and the Arts
Regulatory Oversight 
Tourism and Gaming

New Jersey Senate 
After incumbent senator Jim Whelen's death on August 22, 2017, Democrat Colin Bell was unanimously selected to fill the remainder of  Whelan's senate term and took office, making him the incumbent senator going into the November 2017 general election. In one of the most expensive of the 120 legislative races in the 2017 election, in which $4.6 million was spent, Brown defeated Bell by a 54%-46% margin, taking a Senate seat that had been held by Democrats since 2008 and giving the Republicans their only Senate seat that changed parties, in an election that had many major victories for the Democratic Party across the state. In the Senate, Brown has served as Deputy Conference Leader since January 9, 2018.

Committees 
Joint Committee on Economic Justice and Equal Payment 
Higher Education
State Government, Wagering, Tourism, and Historic Preservation

Electoral history

New Jersey Senate

Assembly 
Brown was elected to the Assembly in 2011  Brown was re-elected in 2013, then again in 2015.

References

External links
Assemblyman Chris A. Brown's legislative web page, New Jersey Legislature
New Jersey Legislature financial disclosure forms
2016 2015 2014 2013 2012 2011

1964 births
United States Army personnel of the Gulf War
Living people
Republican Party New Jersey state senators
New Jersey lawyers
Republican Party members of the New Jersey General Assembly
Politicians from Atlantic City, New Jersey
People from Ventnor City, New Jersey
Rutgers University alumni
United States Army soldiers
Widener University alumni
21st-century American politicians
20th-century American lawyers